Pallywood, a portmanteau of "Palestinian" and "Hollywood", is a coinage used to describe supposed media manipulation, distortion or fraud by some Palestinians putatively designed to win the public relations war with Israel. The term came into currency following the killing of Muhammad al-Durrah in 2000 during the Second Intifada, involving a challenge to the veracity of photographic evidence.

The term was coined and publicized in part by Richard Landes, as a result of an online documentary video he produced called Pallywood: According to Palestinian Sources, alleging specific instances of media manipulation.

Richard Landes' video

In 2005, Richard Landes produced an 18-minute online documentary video called Pallywood: According to Palestinian Sources. Landes and pro-Israel advocates argue that the Israeli government is insufficiently robust in countering Palestinian accounts of events in the Israeli–Palestinian conflict.

In his video, Landes shows Arab-Israeli conflict-related footage that was taken mostly by freelance Palestinian video journalists. He argues that systematic media manipulation (which he dubs "Pallywood") dates back to at least the 1982 Lebanon War, and argues that broadcasters are too uncritical of the veracity of Palestinian freelance footage.

He focuses in particular on the killing of Muhammad al-Durrah, a 12-year-old Palestinian boy that was killed by gunfire in the Gaza Strip on September 30, 2000 at the beginning of the Second Intifada. He was widely reported to have been killed by Israeli gunfire. His death was filmed by a Palestinian freelance cameraman and aired on the France 2 television channel with narration by the veteran French-Israeli journalist Charles Enderlin, who was not present at the scene. It made worldwide headlines and the conduct of the Israeli army was heavily criticized internationally, severely damaging Israel's public standing on the world stage.

Landes questions the authenticity of the footage and disputes whether al-Durrah was killed at all, arguing that the entire incident was staged by the Palestinians. A 2013 Israeli investigation concluded that the al-Durrahs had not been hit by IDF fire and may not have been shot at all. The photographers disputed the Israeli conclusion.

Journalist Ruthie Blum, writing in the Jerusalem Post, describes "Pallywood" as a term coined by Richard Landes to refer to "productions staged by the Palestinians, in front of (and often with cooperation from) Western camera crews, for the purpose of promoting anti-Israel propaganda by disguising it as news." Landes himself describes Pallywood as "a term I coined... to describe staged material disguised as news." Besides al-Durrah, Landes cites the Gaza beach blast and Hamas's alleged exploitation of electricity shortages during the 2007–2008 Israel–Gaza conflict, as incidents of Pallywood. According to Blum, Landes's "pretty harsh claims" have earned him a "reputation in certain circles as a right-wing conspiracy theorist." Landes’ terminology, it has been argued by Crisoula, was skewed to be supportive of Israel, exhibiting ’all the hallmarks of conspiracy theory’.

Other uses
Dr. Anat Berko, a research fellow with the International Policy Institute for Counter-Terrorism, and Dr. Edna Erez, head of the criminal justice department of the University of Illinois at Chicago, say that "the phenomenon of manufacturing documentation about the conflict has been referred to as "Pallywood" (Palestinian Authority Hollywood)." The Mackenzie Institute, a Canadian defense and security think tank, has argued that given "a long history of posing for the cameras... the cynical 'Pallywood' nickname from once-deceived journalists for [Palestinian Authority] news services becomes understandable."

The term has been applied beyond the Muhammad al-Durrah case by conservative commentators such as Michelle Malkin and Melanie Phillips.
Canadian columnist Paul Schneidereit has written, "[...] we've seen cases where the bodies of Palestinian martyrs carried on stretchers are inadvertently dropped, then, of their own volition, climb back on again. We’ve seen reports of massacres, as in Jenin in 2002, that turned out, after independent investigation, to have been greatly exaggerated. Needless to say, such episodes don’t instil an abiding trust in subsequent Palestinian claims, at least until they’re verified."

Controversies and criticism
David Frum alleged that pictures, taking during the 2014 Gaza War, showing two brothers, weeping and with the bloodied T-shirts after carrying the body of their dead father had been faked. The pictures, which were published by Reuters, The New York Times, and Associated Press, had been targeted for criticism by a pro-Israeli blogger. Frum backtracked from his accusation, and apologized to NYT photographer Sergey Ponomarev, after extensive debunking by Michael Shaw, but justified his "skepticism", describing other "Pallywood" claims.

After the death of two Palestinian teenagers in Beitunia, Michael Oren and Israeli official spokesmen argued the video from a security camera was fake or manipulated and the teenagers had only pretended to be hit, a Pallywood view contradicted by both the videos themselves and the official investigation which discovered misconduct by a Border Police officer, who was put on trial for his actions.

Larry Derfner described Pallywood in +972 Magazine as "a particularly ugly ethnic slur". Eyal Weizman, whose work with Forensic Architecture has been called  “Pallywood” in Israel, replied that "The bastards’ last line of defence is to call it ‘fake news’. The minute they revert to this argument is when they’ve lost all the others." In an article published by Mondoweiss, Jonathan Cook argued also in 2018, that "Pallywood" was a convenient excuse used by Israelis to dismiss filmed evidence of brutality by their soldiers.

See also

 Media coverage of the Arab–Israeli conflict
 Deception: Betraying the Peace Process
 Peace, Propaganda, & the Promised Land
 Décryptage
 Relentless: The Struggle for Peace in the Middle East
 The Road to Jenin
 1983 West Bank fainting epidemic
 Israel-related animal conspiracy theories
 Public diplomacy of Israel (Hasbara)

References

Further reading
 "Second Draft.org", website of Richard Landes with films and analysis from the Israeli–Palestinian conflict
Landes, Richard. "Al-Durah: What happened? (video).
Gordon, Philip H. & Tasponar, Omer. "Why France shouldn't legislate Turkey's past," The New Republic, October 30, 2006.

External links
 History of Pallywood on SecondDraft.org.
  HonestReporting video
 "PALLYWOOD - Palestinian Media fraud Industry"

Criticism of journalism
Gaza Strip
Israeli–Palestinian conflict
Mass media in the State of Palestine
Propaganda by topic
News media manipulation
Conspiracy theories